Ontiveros may refer to:

 Javier Ontiveros, Spanish soccer player
 Karin Ontiveros, Mexican model and beauty pageant titleholder
 Lupe Ontiveros, Mexican-American film and television actress
 Omar Ontiveros, American soccer player
 Raúl Meza Ontiveros, Mexican suspected drug lord
 Steve Ontiveros (disambiguation)
 Steve Ontiveros (infielder) (born 1951), Major League Baseball player
 Steve Ontiveros (pitcher) (born 1961), Major League Baseball player

See also
 Fontiveros, a Spanish municipality

The last name ¨Ontiveros¨ can have different spellings such as: Hontiverios, Ontiver, Ontivero. It has a spanish origin.